Julián Suárez is a Colombian male track cyclist. He competed in the team sprint event at the 2015 UCI Track Cycling World Championships.

References

External links
 Profile at the-sports.org

Year of birth missing (living people)
Living people
Colombian track cyclists
Colombian male cyclists
Place of birth missing (living people)
20th-century Colombian people
21st-century Colombian people